Herceg TV is a Herzegovinan commercial television channel based in Trebinje, Bosnia and Herzegovina. The program is mainly produced in Serbian. The TV station was established in 2008.

References

External links 
 Herceg Televizija in Facebook 
 Communications Regulatory Agency of Bosnia and Herzegovina

Television stations in Bosnia and Herzegovina
Television channels and stations established in 2008